CNIC can refer to:

Canadian National Illinois Central Railroad
Citizens' Nuclear Information Center in Japan
Commander, Navy Installations Command (United States)
Computerised National Identity Card, Pakistani identity card
Centre de Neurosciences Intégratives et Cognitives at the University of Bordeaux 1
Centro nacional de investigaciones cardiovasculares (Spain)
Central nucleus of inferior colliculus
Copernic, stock symbol for the web search technology company